WAC may refer to:

Arts
 Walker Art Center, a modern art museum in Minneapolis, Minnesota
 Walton Arts Center, a performing arts center in Fayetteville, Arkansas
 Warwick Arts Centre, at the University of Warwick in Coventry, England

Science
 WAC (gene)
 Welsh Agricultural College
 World Archaeological Congress
 World Association of Copepodologists
 World Agroforestry Centre

Sports
 FAI World Aerobatic Championships
 Washington Athletic Club located in Seattle, Washington
 Western Athletic Conference, an NCAA Division I affiliated college athletics conference
 Wiener AC, an Austrian sports club
 Wolfsberger AC, an Austrian football club
 Wydad AC, a Moroccan sports club

Transport
 Wan Chai station, Hong Kong, by MTR station code
 Warrington Central railway station, England, by National Rail station code2''''Other
 WAC Corporal, the first U.S. sounding rocket
 Washington-Alexandria Architecture Center, extension of Virginia Tech
 Waste Acceptance Criteria, European criteria required to establish whether a waste is suitable for different classes of landfill; see Technical Guidance WM2
 Wathaurong Aboriginal Co-operative, community organization in Geelong, Australia
 We Are Church, a reformist organization within the Roman Catholic Church
 Westminster Archives Centre, library and archives in London
 Wholesale Applications Community, community of mobile phone developers
 Wide Awake Club'', a 1980s British children's television series
 Wollondilly Anglican College, school in Tahmoor, Australia
 Women's Action Coalition, feminist direct action alliance
 Women's Army Corps women's branch of the United States Army
 Women's Auxiliary Corps (India) for women in the British Indian Army
 Worked All Continents, one of the awards issued by the International Amateur Radio Union
 World aeronautical chart, used for navigation by pilots 
 World Amazigh Congress, promotes awareness of the Berber people
 World Avocado Congress, a conference on avocado production
 Writing across the curriculum, a movement aimed at integrating writing into all academic courses
 World Area Codes, US state and world country codes.

See also 
 Wak (disambiguation)
 Wack (disambiguation)
 WAC Basketball Tournament (disambiguation)
 WAC Championship (disambiguation)
 World Affairs Council (disambiguation)